Permocalculus is a genus of red algae known from Permian to Cretaceous strata. Closely aligned to Gymnocodium, it is placed in the Gymnocodiaceae.

References 

Fossil algae
Red algae genera
Permian first appearances
Cretaceous extinctions